Cusic is a surname. Notable people with the surname include:

Don Cusic, American author, songwriter and record producer 
Eddie Cusic (1926–2015), American Mississippi blues guitarist, singer, and songwriter
Marshall E. Cusic Jr., retired Rear Admiral in the United States Navy Reserve
Wayne Cusic (1905–1993), American college football and basketball player and coach